The Adecco Group, is a SwissFrench company based in Zurich, Switzerland, and is the world's second largest Human Resources provider and temporary staffing firm, and a Fortune Global 500 company.

They directly employ 700,000 people a day, and with the expansion of its operations to China, the number of people working under them totals up to 3.5 million.

The company was formed officially on 1 January 1997 as a result of the merger of the French company Ecco and the Swiss company Adia Interim, and is listed on the SIX Swiss Exchange (ADEN, ISIN CH0012138605). Adia was established in 1957 in Lausanne (Switzerland) by Henri Lavanchy. Ecco was founded in Lyon (France) at the initiative of Philippe Foriel Destezet. In 2000, The Adecco Group acquired Olsten Staffing, in the US, becoming the number one recruitment company in that country. In 2010, it acquired MPS Group and thus became the number one company worldwide.

The Adecco Group is the parent company of various brands including Adecco, Modis, Spring Professional, Badenoch & Clark, Pontoon, General Assembly, Vettery, Adia and Lee Hecht Harrison.

Services
The Adecco Group provides services covering temporary staffing, permanent placement, career transition and talent development as well as business process outsourcing and consulting.

As for staffing, The Adecco Group covers many sectors, including office, industrial, technical, financial and legal, amongst others.

History
 1957: Adia is founded by Henri Lavanchy in Lausanne, Switzerland
 1964: Ecco is founded by Philippe Foriel-Destezet in Lyon, France
 1996: Personnel services firms Ecco and Adia Interim merged to form a global company with annualised revenues of €5.4 billion. Operations were combined to form a network of 2,500 branches and 250,000 staff.
 1997: Adecco S.A. acquired TAD Resources International, a Cambridge, Massachussets-based temporary-staffing company, for $387.5 million.
 2000: The Adecco Group acquired Olsten Staffing. The merged company generated combined revenues of €11.6 billion.
 2002: The Adecco Group consolidated its businesses and created divisions to manage its business.
 2005: The Adecco Group expanded across six professional business lines.
 2006: Following the acquisition of DIS AG, Germany, Dieter Scheiff assumed the position of chief executive officer of The Adecco Group. Dominik de Daniel became chief financial officer.
 2007: The annual shareholders' meeting approved the nomination of Jürgen Dormann, former vice chairman, as chairman of the board. Rolf Dörig became vice-chairman. Klaus J. Jacobs, the co-founder of Adecco, handed back his mandate, having reached the statutory retirement age.
 2008: On 11 September, Klaus J. Jacobs, founder and honorary president of The Adecco Group, died. Jürgen Dormann stepped down at year-end, as chairman of the board of directors.
 2009: Rolf Dörig started as chairman of the board of directors of The Adecco Group. On 1 June, Patrick De Maeseneire took over as chief executive officer of The Adecco Group from Dieter Scheiff. The Adecco Group acquires Spring Group in the UK, and tabled an offer for MPS Group.
 2010: The acquisition of MPS Group officially closed. The Adecco Group set up a joint venture in Shanghai with Chinese HR services company Fesco.
 2011: FESCO Adecco began operations on 1 January. The Adecco Group announced the acquisition of US-based Drake Beam Morin, Inc.
 2012: The Adecco Group acquired VSN Inc., a provider of professional staffing services in Japan. Henri-Ferdinand Lavanchy, the founder of Adia, died.
 2014: The Adecco Group acquired OnForce to expand its Beeline service offering, creating a unique integrated solution for managing contingent workforces. The Jacobs Group sold the majority of its 18% stake in the Adecco Group.
 2015: On 11 March, The Adecco Group acquired Knightsbridge Human Capital Solutions, a Canadian company offering career transition, talent and leadership development and recruitment services. On 1 September, Alain Dehaze took over as chief executive officer of The Adecco Group from Patrick De Maeseneire. 
 2016: On 10 May, The Adecco Group closed the acquisition of Penna Consulting Plc, a UK company providing career transition and talent development services, as well as recruitment services. 
 2017: The Adecco Group global headquarters in Zürich moved from Glattbrugg to the city, in Bellerivestrasse. 
 2018: The Adecco Group acquired General Assembly and Vettery
 2019: The Adecco Group announced the divestment of Soliant Health in the US. The healthcare staffing business was sold to Olympus Partners for a cash consideration of US$612 million (EUR 551 million).
2020: In April 2020, Jean-Christophe Deslarzes is appointed chair of the board of directors. In May 2020, The Adecco Group formed an alliance with Randstad BV and ManpowerGroup, launching new guidance for a safe return to work after the COVID-19 outbreak.
2022: In May 2022, Adecco announced that Denis Machuel will replace Alain Dehaze and he will take charge on July 1, 2022.'

Global brands
The Adecco Group operates in the market through various brands, including
Adecco
ADIA
 Spring Professional
Badenoch & Clark
Pontoon
 Lee Hecht Harrison
 General Assembly
Hired
 DIS AG
 Akkodis

Scandals
In 2004, Adecco delayed publication of its results because of accounting problems.

With investors already nervous following the collapse of Italian dairy group Parmalat, shares in Adecco – which places 650,000 people on assignment each day for clients such as IBM – were down 44.2% at 45.50 Swiss francs (£20.13). The loss wiped out the previous year's 47% share price gain, which came amid expectations that global economic recovery would boost the firm's temp business. The run on Adecco's shares followed a short statement from the company about the delay in its earnings release, which had originally been scheduled for February 4. Adecco said that the delay stemmed from several reasons including "the identification of material weaknesses in internal controls in the company's North American operations of Adecco Staffing". Adecco did not disclose details of irregularities it had found in an internal review. Investors were left uncertain, but were concerned that the company could be the latest casualty in a wave of accounting scandals.

Problems had also engulfed Enron, Ahold and Parmalat, where billion-dollar frauds led to criminal investigations. There was speculation that Adecco's problems could be connected to its acquisition of US jobs firm Olsten for $1.6bn (£865m) in March 2000.

Litigation

Adecco UK Ltd v. Adecco UK Recruitment Ltd
On 10 December 2008, Adecco UK Ltd applied to the Company Names Tribunal under s.69(1)(b) Companies Act 2006 for a change of name of Adecco UK Recruitment Ltd, which had been registered at Companies House since 14 October 2008.

The application went undefended by the respondent and the adjudicator ordered on 3 March 2009, that Adecco UK Recruitment Ltd must change their name within one month. Additionally the respondent was ordered not to cause or permit any steps to be taken to register another company with an offending name which could interfere, due to its similarity, with the goodwill of the applicant.

Adecco UK Recruitment Ltd was also ordered to pay a contribution towards Adecco UK Ltd's costs.

See also

 The Adecco Group North America
 Adecco General Staffing, Australia

References

External links

 
 
 
 The Adecco Group - YouTube
 The Adecco Group - LinkedIn

Companies listed on the SIX Swiss Exchange
Multinational companies headquartered in Switzerland
Consulting firms established in 1996
Employment agencies
Actuarial firms
Human resource management consulting firms
Companies based in Zürich
Service companies of Switzerland
Temporary employment agencies